In Family I Trust is a 2019 Spanish romantic comedy film directed by Patricia Font which stars Clara Lago alongside Álex García, Alexandra Jiménez, Paula Malia, Fernando Guallar, Carlos Cuevas, and Carmen Maura. It is based on the novel by Laura Norton.

Plot 
After losing her job and her fiancee, Bea (an architect) faces the prospect of returning to her hometown.

Cast

Production 
A Zeta Cinema and Atresmedia Cine production, the film also had the participation of TV3 and Netflix.

Release 
Distributed by DeAPlaneta, it was theatrically released in Spain on 18 January 2019.

See also 
 List of Spanish films of 2019

References

External links
 
 
 
 

Spanish romantic comedy films
2019 romantic comedy films
Corporació Catalana de Mitjans Audiovisuals
Films shot in Barcelona
2019 films
Zeta Studios films
Atresmedia Cine films
Films based on Spanish novels
2010s Spanish-language films
2010s Spanish films